The Spain national under-15 football team is the national team that represents Spain and the Royal Spanish Football Federation under this age level. It is currently the youngest feeder for the national team and competes in such tournaments as the Under-15 Nations Cup, a competition that is seen as an attempt in creating an Under-15 FIFA World Cup in the near future. 

As FIFA plan in making a World Cup tournament for players under the age of 15 soon, the Spain national team returned from a five-year hiatus, (the last time the team played was in 2007 when they were crowned champions in the Torneo Villa de Santiago del Teide for the fifth consecutive time) to participate in a tournament that was hosted by Mexico in June 2012, the Nations Cup.

Players
Spain's players who have played at Under-15  include Fernando Torres,  Iker Muniain, Marc Muniesa, Javi Martínez, Gavi and Andrés Iniesta.

Competitive record

Youth Olympic Games

Under-15 World Cup/Nations Cup

Torneo Villa de Santiago del Teide

Honours
Under-15 World Cup/Nations Cup
 Semi-Finals (1): 2012
Torneo Villa de Santiago del Teide
 Winners (6): 2001, 2003, 2004, 2005, 2006, 2007
 Runners-up (1): 2002

See also
 Spain national football team
 Spain Olympic football team
 Spain national under-21 football team
 Spain national under-20 football team
 Spain national under-19 football team
 Spain national under-18 football team
 Spain national under-17 football team
 Spain national under-16 football team

References

European national under-15 association football teams
Football